Peter Neururer (born 26 April 1955) is a German professional football manager, notable for coaching a number of Bundesliga clubs.

Managerial career

Neururer had a minor playing career in the lower leagues before moving into coaching at TuS Haltern and SG Weitmar. He moved into the higher leagues as assistant manager of Horst Hrubesch at 2. Bundesliga club Rot-Weiss Essen in the 1986–87 season, and eventually had a two-month spell in sole command in late 1987. Neururer won two of his nine matches as manager.

Neururer then gained an outright managerial position at this level with Alemannia Aachen in January 1988. After landing the club a 6th-place finish where he won 10 out of 17 matches in the 1987–88 season and a strong following season, he was approached by Schalke 04, who were enduring a difficult season after relegation. Neururer left the club on 10 April 1989. His final match was a 1–0 loss against SV Darmstadt 98 on 7 April 1989. Alemannia Aachen were in seventh place when he left the club. He Finished with a record of 23 wins, nine draws, and 13 losses.

Neururer was chosen as manager of FC Schalke 04 on 11 April 1989. Neururer took the Ruhr club to 5th place in 1989–90 and started the following season brightly as well, with the club being second after the opening three months. However, this was not enough to satisfy the club president who fired him nonetheless in November 1990. He finished with a record of 33 wins, 16 draws, and 17 losses. In June 2007, Neururer created controversy when he claimed that doping had been rife in German football in the 1990s. He specifically referred to his time as manager of FC Schalke 04 in 1989–90 in this accusation, although this was refuted by the club itself.

Neururer did not have to wait too long for another opportunity as Bundesliga side Hertha BSC came calling after they had fired Pál Csernai. Neururer immediately took over in March 1991. The club were sat bottom the table at this point and Neururer was unable to stop the rot, as the team failed to win a single game in his 14 in charge and were duly relegated. Unsurprisingly, Neururer left Hertha BSC at this point in May 1991. He finished with a record of no wins, two draws, and 10 losses.

Neururer joined 1. FC Saarbrücken on 1 July 1991. At 1. FC Saarbrücken, Neururer enjoyed his greatest success yet as the team won the league and were promoted to the top flight. Their time in the Bundesliga was not to prove lengthy though, as they finished bottom in their first season back at this level, which also spelled the end for Neururer. Neururer left the club on 30 June 1993. He finished with a record of 21 wins, 25 draws, and 22 losses.

Neururer's next post was at second flight Hannover 96. Neururer took over on 7 November 1994. The club was at the bottom of the table. Neururer stabilised the team in his six months there and maintained their league status. Neururer left the club on 30 May 1995. He finished with a record of seven wins, seven draws, and six losses.

He had to wait until the following year for another management role, when Bundesliga side 1. FC Köln moved for him after firing Stephan Engels when they sunk into the relegation zone. Neururer again managed to retain a club's league status as they finished 12th. He managed a 10th-place finish the following season, but after a disappointing start to the 1997–98 season, he was fired in September 1997. He finished with a record of 25 wins, eight draws, and 27 losses.

Neururer was manager of Fortuna Düsseldorf from 22 April 1999 to the end of the season. He finished with a record of two wins, one draw, and five losses.

Neururer joined Kickers Offenbach in October 1999. The club were bottom of the 2. Bundesliga at the time, and Neururer was unable to reverse their fortunes and they slipped to the Regionalliga Süd. He began the following season still with the club but after failing to win either of their opening two games, the club acted swiftly and he was dismissed on 6 August 2000. He finished with a record of eight wins, nine draws, and 10 losses.

He returned to the second flight with LR Ahlen in October 2000. His first season brought a 7th-place finish, but an indifferent start to the 2001–02 season saw him leaving the club for fellow 2. Bundesliga outfit VfL Bochum.

VfL Bochum hired Neururer on 3 December 2001. VfL Bochum was another period of success for the coach as they were promoted in his first season and he retained their Bundesliga position for two seasons. Neururer left the club on 30 June 2005. He finished with a record of 53 wins, 33 draws, and 47 losses.

In November 2005 he was given another shot at the top level, as Hannover took him on for a second spell after sacking Ewald Lienen. He guided to team to a comfortable 12th-place finish at the end of the 2005–06 season but a disastrous start to the 2006–07 season – conceding 11 goals in 3 defeats. Neururer resigned on 30 August 2006. He finished with a record of five wins, 11 draws, and 10 losses.

MSV Duisburg hired Neururer on 16 November 2008. He was fired by the club on 30 October 2009, finishing with a record of 16 wins, 11 draws, and seven losses.

On 8 April 2013, Neuruer returned as manager to Bochum. The club fired him on 9 December 2014. He finished with a record of 21 wins, 15 draws, and 24 losses.

In 2019, Neururer served as the sporting director for Regionalliga West club SG Wattenscheid 09.

Managerial record

References

External links
 Peter Neururer – official website

1955 births
Living people
People from Marl, North Rhine-Westphalia
Sportspeople from Münster (region)
Footballers from North Rhine-Westphalia
German footballers
ASC Schöppingen players
German football managers
Alemannia Aachen managers
FC Schalke 04 managers
Hertha BSC managers
Hannover 96 managers
1. FC Köln managers
Fortuna Düsseldorf managers
VfL Bochum managers
MSV Duisburg managers
Bundesliga managers
Rot Weiss Ahlen managers
Rot-Weiss Essen managers
Kickers Offenbach managers
2. Bundesliga managers
Association footballers not categorized by position
STV Horst-Emscher players
West German footballers
West German football managers